Peter Gillon (born 11 August 1939) is an Australian rower who competed at two Olympic Games. 

He competed at the 1960 Rome and the 1964 Tokyo Olympics in the men's coxless four.

He later became a property developer in Melbourne, as managing director of Gillon Group.

References

External links
Profile at Australian Olympic Committee

1939 births
Living people
Australian male rowers
Olympic rowers of Australia
Rowers at the 1960 Summer Olympics
Rowers at the 1964 Summer Olympics
Australian real estate businesspeople